"Lola Soledad" is a song recorded by the Spanish singer-songwriter Alejandro Sanz. It was released as the fourth and last single from his eighth studio album Paraíso Express (2009).  The song was released for digital download on October 15, 2010.

Song information

The song is a tribute to a special woman's life, named Lola. It's about loneliness of lola and how she lives her life. also Alejandro sings about himself and his feelings for Lola. In the second chorus of the song, he sings "Tú ya no estás sola aquí estoy yo", It means "You are not alone here I am", Alejandro comes to save his love from this loneliness and stay with her to end her sadness.

Music video

A music video for the song was filmed in October 2010. Director of the video is Gracia Querejeta. she is a famous Spanish director who also directed movies like Las palabras de Max and Seven Billiard Tables.

It also stars Spanish actress, Maribel Verdú. Verdú played Lola role in this video. In the beginning of the video we saw a clock ringing. lola woke up and started her day, washed the dishes and made coffee. in this video, we clearly saw loneliness of lola in her daily life. finally, we saw Alejandro found his way to Lola to end her loneliness . in the last scene, Lola came from behind and kissed Alejandro.

Duet version with Joaquin Sabina
In 2010, Alejandro released his new Live album, Canciones Para Un Paraíso En Vivo. In this album, he put a Bonus track, new version of Lola Soledad featuring Spanish singer, Joaquin Sabina. This track officially released on November 11, 2011.

Live performances
The single was performed live many times. On many stages, Alejandro performed this music by himself, like the original version and on few stages, Alejandro Performed it with a guest artist. For example, once Sanz invited Colombian singer-songwriter Juanes to Miami, Flo. to performe this music with him. or at 2011 Viña del Mar International Song Festival, Sanz invited Argentinian singer Noel Schajris to do a duet on this song. Interesting fact is that both Juanes and Noel Schajris had some mistakes during their performances.

Chart performance

References

External links
"Lola Soledad" Lyrics

2009 singles
Number-one singles in Spain
Spanish-language songs
Alejandro Sanz songs
Songs written by Alejandro Sanz
Songs written by Tommy Torres
Pop ballads
Warner Music Latina singles
2009 songs